Gorka Pintado del Molino (born 24 March 1978) is a Spanish retired footballer who played as a striker.

Football career
Pintado was born in San Sebastián, Gipuzkoa. During his Spanish career he played mostly in the third division, having an unassuming spell in the second level with CD Leganés (no goals scored in nearly two full seasons).

On 6 June 2008, at already 30, Pintado signed with Swansea City from Granada CF for a fee of around €200,000, after netting 18 goals during the campaign. At the Welsh side he hooked up with compatriots Guillem Bauzà, Jordi Gómez, Roberto Martínez (coach), Àngel Rangel and Albert Serrán, and he scored his first league goal for them during a 3–1 win over Nottingham Forest, at the Liberty Stadium.

Although limited to substitute appearances, Pintado netted his second goal of the season in Swansea's 2–2 draw at home to Cardiff City, volleying home for the equaliser. He went on to score three more times, against Southampton, Derby County and Crystal Palace.

On 6 January 2011, Pintado moved to Cypriot First Division club AEK Larnaca FC on loan until June. On 23 August, the move was made permanent.

References

External links

1978 births
Living people
Spanish footballers
Footballers from San Sebastián
Association football forwards
Segunda División players
Segunda División B players
Real Unión footballers
CA Osasuna B players
CD Leganés players
UE Figueres footballers
UDA Gramenet footballers
Granada CF footballers
English Football League players
Swansea City A.F.C. players
Cypriot First Division players
AEK Larnaca FC players
Spanish expatriate footballers
Expatriate footballers in Wales
Expatriate footballers in Cyprus
Spanish expatriate sportspeople in Wales
Spanish expatriate sportspeople in Cyprus